Pescadillo homolog is a protein that in humans is encoded by the PES1 gene.

This gene encodes a protein that is abnormally elevated in malignant tumors of astrocytic origin. It is a strongly conserved gene containing a BRCT domain that is essential for the activity of this gene product. The gene plays a crucial role in cell proliferation and may be necessary for oncogenic transformation and tumor progression.

References

Further reading